Interstate 124 (I-124) is an unsigned designation for a short segment of a controlled-access highway located in Chattanooga, Tennessee. During periods where this  segment of U.S. Route 27 (US 27) has been signed as I-124, it has served as a spur route of I-24 to downtown Chattanooga. The road segment has not been signed as I-124 since the late 1980s (it is marked on overhead signs and milemarkers as US 27), and the Tennessee Department of Transportation official map no longer designates it as I-124, but some DOT publications still make reference to the designation.

Route description
The US 27 freeway diverges from I-24 just before the Moccasin Bend in the Tennessee River, continues north through downtown Chattanooga, and then across the Tennessee River as a limited-access freeway on the P. R. Olgiati Bridge. The river is the point at which the I-124 designation ends. After crossing the river, the freeway continues under the US 27 designation for another , beyond which the spur continues under the State Route 111 (SR 111) designation for a further .

The entire length of I-124 is part of the National Highway System, a system of routes determined to be the most important for the nation's economy, mobility, and defense.

History

The route that is now I-124 was proposed in the 1950s by then-mayor of Chattanooga P.R. "Rudy" Olgiati to provide a secondary access across the Tennessee River and relieve congestion, which had developed on the Market Street and Walnut Street Bridges. The section of highway between Martin Luther King Jr. Boulevard was built between 1955 and 1959. The southern portion, located between I-24 and Martin Luther King Jr. Boulevard, was built between 1961 and 1963, when that corresponding section of I-24 was built. The interchange with I-24, known as the "Big Scramble", was reworked in the late 1980s and early 1990s, and the I-124 signage was removed at this time.

A major reconstruction project commenced in December 2015 to widen and modernize I-124, which will reconstruct all interchanges, provide adequate shoulders and median divider, widen the route to six lanes, and remove the S-curve at the 4th street interchange. Originally scheduled to be completed by July 2019, the project ran into multiple setbacks, which delayed the completion until January 2021.

Exit list

See also

References

External links

 I-124 at AARoads

Transportation in Hamilton County, Tennessee
24-1
24-1
Transportation in Chattanooga, Tennessee
24-1
 1
U.S. Route 27